Mark O'Hara House, also known as the W. F. Kuenzel House, is a historic home located at Washington, Franklin County, Missouri. It was built about 1856, and is a large -story, five bay, Federal style brick dwelling on a stone foundation.  It has a two-story brick side ell, side gable roof, and flat topped door and window openings.

It was listed on the National Register of Historic Places in 2000.

References

Houses on the National Register of Historic Places in Missouri
Federal architecture in Missouri
Houses completed in 1856
Buildings and structures in Franklin County, Missouri
National Register of Historic Places in Franklin County, Missouri